Major General Sir Evelyn John Webb-Carter  (born 30 January 1946) is a retired senior British Army officer. He was the last 'Colonel of the Regiment' of the Duke of Wellington's Regiment (West Riding) (1999–2006), before their amalgamation into the Yorkshire Regiment, 3rd Battalion (Duke of Wellington's).

Early life
Webb-Carter is the son of Brigadier Brian Wolseley Webb-Carter, DSO & Bar, OBE (1920–1981). He was educated at Wellington College in Berkshire, before joining the Royal Military Academy in Sandhurst.

Military career
He was commissioned into the Grenadier Guards in 1964, and was mentioned in dispatches for service in Northern Ireland in 1980. In 1991 he became Commander of 19th Infantry Brigade and in late 1996 he was appointed the Commander of the Multi-National Division (South-West) for the Stabilisation Force in Bosnia.

In June 1997, he was appointed Major-General commanding the Household Division and General Officer Commanding London District where he gained a strong reputation for tackling racism in the Guards Division. He was the Chairman of Queen Elizabeth, the Queen Mother's 100th birthday celebrations in 2000 and retired in 2001.

He was a Controller of the Army Benevolent Fund, a British charity set up to provide help for former British soldiers and their families who are in need of assistance.

Family
He married the Hon. Anne Celia Wigram (born 1945), the second daughter of Lieutenant Colonel Neville Wigram, 2nd Baron Wigram, in 1973.

References

|-
 

1946 births
Living people
British Army major generals
Knights Commander of the Royal Victorian Order
Officers of the Order of the British Empire
Grenadier Guards officers
Deputy Lieutenants of Gloucestershire
Duke of Wellington's Regiment officers
People educated at Wellington College, Berkshire
British military personnel of The Troubles (Northern Ireland)
Recipients of the Commendation for Valuable Service